The Kamtapur Liberation Organisation ( KLO) is a militant organisation based in Northeast India whose objective is to  Separate the Kamtapur nation from West Bengal and Assam. The proposed state is to comprise six districts in West Bengal and four contiguous districts of Assam which are Cooch Behar, Darjeeling, Jalpaiguri, North and South Dinajpur and Malda, Kokrajhar, Bongaigaon, Dhubri and Goalpara, Kishanganj districts in Bihar, and Jhapa District in Nepal. The KLO was formed to address problems of the Koch Rajbongshi people such as large-scale unemployment, land alienation, perceived neglect of Kamtapuri language, identity, and grievances of economic deprivation.

History
The beginning of the Kamtapur Liberation Organisation (KLO) can be traced to the attempts of certain members of the Koch Rajbongshi people belonging to the All Kamtapur Students Union (AKSU) to organise an armed struggle for a separate Kamtapur nation. For this purpose, they approached the United Liberation Front of Asom (ULFA). The KLO came into existence on December 28, 1995.

Leadership and organisation
Tamir Das alias Jibon Singha is the chairman of the KLO. He was arrested in October 1999 but regained control over the outfit after he was released by the Assam Police in a bid to make the other KLO cadres surrender. Milton Burman alias Mihir Das is the second in command of the outfit.

See also
Insurgency in Northeast India
Koch Rajbongshi people
Koch dynasty
Kamata Kingdom
Koch Bihar
Koch Hajo
Uttar Bango Tapsili Jati O Adibasi Sangathan

References

External links
About KLO at SATP

1995 establishments in Assam
Politics of Assam
Organizations based in Asia designated as terrorist
Organisations based in Assam
Organisations designated as terrorist by India
Left-wing militant groups in India
National liberation movements
1999 establishments in Assam